The Rehbach is a river in Rhineland-Palatinate.

History 

The Rehbach does not have a source:  The Speyerbach splits on the Winzinger Wassergescheid in Neustadt an der Weinstrasse, with about 1/3 of the water going left and forming the Rehbach and the other 2/3 going right and continuing as Speyerbach.  After leaving the district of Neustadt, the Rehbach flows through the western part of the Upper Rhine Valley, initially in an easterly direction, later more northeast.  It touches the municipalities of Haßloch, Böhl-Iggelheim, Schifferstadt, Limburgerhof and Neuhofen.  Between Altrip and Ludwigshafen, it flows into the Upper Rhine from the left.

Tributaries 
The main tributaries of the left Rehbach are Mußbach, which flows into the Rehbach between Haßloch and the Mußbach district of Neustadt, and the Steinbach, which flows into the Rehbach above Schifferstadt.  The strongest right tributary is the Ranschgraben.  Like the Rehbach itself, this is a tributary of the Speyerbach.  It splits off from Speyerbach just north of Speyerdorf and flows into Rehbach East of Limburgerhof-Rehhütte, after crossing below Rehbach a few hundred meters before at Limburgerhof-Kohlhof.

History 
In the Middle Ages, the water of the Rehbach was already diverted from Speyerbach in the village of Winzingen, which today is a district of Neustadt. They provided the water for the local drive watermills and sawmills. On the southern arm, the actual Rehbach, three mills have been preserved. Below Böhl-Iggelheim, the Steinbach flows into the Rehbach, as does the water from the Niederwiesenweiher, a  re-naturalized gravel pit.

Since 1981, large parts of the Speyerbach and Rehbach between Neustadt and Speyer, that were not used for industrial purposes, form the landscape conservation area Rehbach-Speyerbach.

See also 
List of rivers of Rhineland-Palatinate

Footnotes 

Rivers of Rhineland-Palatinate
Anterior Palatinate
Rivers of Germany